Dallam School is a mixed, 11-19 secondary school with academy status, located in Milnthorpe, Cumbria, England.

History
The school was founded in 1984 through the merger of Heversham Grammar School and Milnthorpe Secondary School. Heversham School was founded and endowed on 24 January 1619/20, by Edward Wilson, Kt (1557-1653), of Nether Levens, who also owned Heversham Hall.  It occupied the site known in recent years as Old School, above and behind the village church, on Heversham Head.  The building is now a private house.  The present ivy-clad Boarding House and Big School (formerly the school hall) date from the 1880s.

After occupying many different buildings around the village, Milnthorpe Secondary School moved to its current location, complete with Community Centre, in 1968.

Dallam is a boarding school, the boarding house being on a separate site from that of the main school.

In 2002, Mr Steven Holdup became Headteacher of the school.

In 2010, the school brought the PE department down from the Heversham site with an all-weather astroturf pitch, and new sports facilities.

In 2013, Mr William Bancroft became Headteacher of the school.

In 2018, Mr Nigel Whittle became Headteacher of the school.

In 2019, Ms Julie O'Connor became Executive Headteacher of the school.

In 2021, Ms Rachael Williams became Headteacher of the school.

Sixth form
Dallam School has a sixth form, which offers A-levels.and BTECs 
The subjects offered are:

 Art and Design
 Biology
 Business Studies
 Chemistry
 Computing
 Criminology
 English Language
 English Literature
 French
 Further Mathematics (AS Level)
 Geography
 Health and Social Care
 History
 Mathematics
 Media Studies
 Music
 PE
 Physics
 Product Design
 Psychology
 Sociology
 Spanish
 Travel and Tourism

Notable alumni

Heversham Grammar School
John Young Stratton (1829/30 – 1905): author, essayist, social reformer
William Whewell (1794–1866): scientist, theologian

Dallam School
James Knox (cyclist) (b. 1995): road racing cyclist with the Belgian Deceuninck–Quick-Step team

See also

 List of the oldest schools in the United Kingdom

References

External links
 Dallam School

Secondary schools in Cumbria
1984 establishments in England
Educational institutions established in 1984
Academies in Cumbria
International Baccalaureate schools in England
Milnthorpe